Bohdan Kaminský (pen name Karel Bušek) (24 February 1859 in Husa – 13 July 1929 in Poděbrady) was a Czech poet and translator.

Biography
Kaminský was originally a wood-carver. In the years 1878-82 he studied arts in Prague. During his life Kaminský frequently travelled abroad.

Literary work
Kaminský is associated with the literary group Lumír. His verses are about disappointment in love and social injustice but he also wrote humorous, ironic poems and texts for a comedy theatre. Another motive was his birthplace area.

Kaminský also translated from French (Molière) and German (Schiller).

External links

 Biography (in Czech)

Czech poets
Czech male poets
1929 deaths
1859 births
People from Liberec District